The Tohono Oʼodham are a Native American people of the United States and Mexico.

Tohono Oʼodham may also refer to:

Tohono Oʼodham language
Tohono Oʼodham Nation, a federally recognized tribe in the U.S.